An antibody fragment can be:

a fragment antigen-binding (Fab)
a fragment crystallizable (Fc)